Seymour may refer to:

Places

Australia 
Seymour, Victoria, a township
Electoral district of Seymour, a former electoral district in Victoria
Rural City of Seymour, a former local government area in Victoria
Seymour, Tasmania, a locality

Canada 
 Seymour Range, a mountain range in British Columbia
 Mount Seymour, British Columbia
 Seymour River (Burrard Inlet), British Columbia
 Seymour River (Shuswap Lake), British Columbia
 Seymour Inlet, British Columbia
 Seymour Narrows, British Columbia
 Seymour Island (Nunavut)
 Seymour Township, Ontario

United States 
 Seymour, Connecticut, a town
 Seymour, Illinois, a census-designated place
 Seymour, Indiana, a city
 Seymour, Iowa, a city
 Seymour, Missouri, a city
 Seymour, Tennessee, an unincorporated community and census-designated place
 Seymour, Texas, a city
 Seymour, Wisconsin (disambiguation)

Elsewhere 
 Seymour Island, off the tip of Graham Land on the Antarctic Peninsula
 Seymour, Eastern Cape, South Africa, a town

People and fictional characters 
 Seymour (given name)
 Seymour (surname)

Other uses 
 , more than one ship of the British Royal Navy
 Seymour baronets, two titles in the Baronetage of England and one in the Baronetage of the United Kingdom
 Seymour Airport, Galápagos Islands, Ecuador
 Seymour College, a day and boarding school in Glen Osmond, South Australia
 Seymour Football Club, Victoria, Australia
 Seymour, the original title of the band Blur (band)

See also 
 Justice Seymour (disambiguation)
 Seemore (disambiguation)
 Seymore